The 5th Gran Premio di Napoli was a motor race, run to Formula Two rules, held on 11 May 1952 at Posillipo, Naples. The race was run over 60 laps of the circuit, and was won by Italian driver Giuseppe Farina in a Ferrari 500. Farina also took pole and set fastest lap. Teammate Piero Taruffi was second and Franco Comotti was third in a privateer Ferrari 166.

Results

References

Naples Grand Prix
Grand Prix of Naples
Naples
Naples